John Pritchard (30 August 1861 – 22 February 1941) was a Progressive party member of the House of Commons of Canada. He was born in Durham County, Canada West and became a farmer.

He was elected to Parliament at the Wellington North riding in the 1921 general election. After serving his only federal term, the 14th Canadian Parliament, Pritchard was defeated by Duncan Sinclair of the Conservatives in the 1925 federal election.

External links
 

1861 births
1941 deaths
Canadian farmers
Members of the House of Commons of Canada from Ontario
Progressive Party of Canada MPs